This list of tallest buildings in Nevada ranks buildings in the state of Nevada by tallest height. The tower, located north of the Las Vegas Strip, is also the tallest observation tower in the United States. Because the tower is not fully habitable, it is not considered a building.

List of tallest buildings
An equal sign (=) following a rank indicates a shared height between two or more buildings. The "Year" column indicates the year in which a building was completed. Freestanding observation towers, while not habitable buildings, are included for comparison purposes but not ranked.

Buildings over 500 feet

Buildings from 400 to 500 feet

Buildings from 250 to 400 feet

Timeline of tallest buildings since 1877
From 1927 to 1956, most of the state's tallest buildings were located in Reno. Since 1956, the state's tallest buildings have been located in the Las Vegas Valley, beginning with the opening of the Fremont Hotel and Casino in Las Vegas. The Strat tower, completed in 1996, is excluded from this timeline.

See also
 List of tallest buildings in Las Vegas
 Crown Las Vegas, a cancelled skyscraper that would have been the tallest building in the state

Notes

References

Nevada
Tallest